A. S. M. Feroz is a Bangladesh Awami League politician, the incumbent Member of Parliament from Patuakhali-2 and former Chief Whip of the Bangladeshi parliament.

Early life
Feroz was born on 1 February 1952. He has a M.A. degree in history from Brojomohun College. He is a veteran of the Bangladesh Liberation War.

Career
Feroz was first elected to parliament in 1979 during the tenure of President and military chief Ziaur Rahman. He joined the Bangladesh Awami League in 1986. He was elected to Parliament in 1986 as an independent candidate. He was elected to Parliament from Patuakhali-2 in 2008 and 2014 as a candidate of the Bangladesh Awami League. He served in the 9th Jatiya Sangsad as the whip and was appointed the chief whip in the 10th Jatiya Sangsad.

Feroz owns M/S Patuakhali Jute Mills which has 260 million taka in outstanding loans from Sonali Bank. The Bank rescheduled the loan so that he could stand for elections in 2018. He was re-elected from Patuakhali-2 with 185,783 votes while his nearest rival, Salma Alam of Bangladesh Nationalist Party, received 5,660 votes.

In July 2020, Feroz was removed from the post of Director of Mercantile Bank Limited over his defaulted loans by Bangladesh Bank. In February 2021, 10 people were injured in clashes between supporters of Feroz and Ziaul Haque Jewel, mayor of Baufal Municipality Mayor.

References

1952 births
Living people
2nd Jatiya Sangsad members
3rd Jatiya Sangsad members
5th Jatiya Sangsad members
9th Jatiya Sangsad members
10th Jatiya Sangsad members
11th Jatiya Sangsad members
Awami League politicians
People of the Bangladesh Liberation War